This is a list of military units raised by the Commonwealth of Kentucky, a Union border state during the American Civil War, for service in the Union Army. Southern both geographically and culturally, an estimated 125,000 Kentuckians served as Union soldiers; almost quadruple the number of Kentuckians serving as Confederate soldiers (numbered at 35,000). The list of Kentucky's Confederate Civil War units is shown separately.

Artillery

Cavalry

Engineers
Patterson's Independent Company Kentucky Volunteer Engineers

Infantry

Militia
Louisville Home Guard

Footnotes

References
The Civil War Archive
 Dyer, Frederick H. (1959). A Compendium of the War of the Rebellion. New York and London. Thomas Yoseloff, Publisher. 
 Unknown. (2006). Civil War Regiments from Kentucky and Tennessee. eBookOnDisk.com Pensacola, Florida.

See also
Lists of American Civil War Regiments by State

Kentucky
Civil War